Niall Dean Farrell (born 6 September 1997) is a British amateur boxer who is affiliated with Kingstanding 2nd City ABC.

Boxing career
Farrell won the 2017 Amateur Boxing Association British flyweight title, when boxing out of the Kingstanding 2nd City.

In 2017 he won a silver medal at the European Championships and went to contest the World Championships. Injuries thereafter kept him out of major competitions (including the 2020 Olympic qualifier), but he eventually recovered and earned selection for the World Championships in 2021.

References

1997 births
Living people
British male boxers
English male boxers
Featherweight boxers